The Goethals Bridge is the name of a pair of cable-stayed bridge spans connecting Elizabeth, New Jersey, to Staten Island, New York, in the United States. The spans cross a strait known as Arthur Kill, and replaced a cantilever bridge span built in 1928. The bridge is operated by the Port Authority of New York and New Jersey.

The original cantilever span was one of the first structures built by the Port Authority. The bridge was grandfathered into Interstate 278, and named for Major General George Washington Goethals, who supervised construction of the Panama Canal and was the first consulting engineer of the Port Authority.

In 2013, two new cable-stayed crossings, running parallel to the old cantilever bridge and replacing it, were approved. The new eastbound span opened on June 10, 2017, at which time the original span was closed. The old cantilever span was dismantled in January 2018 and the new westbound span opened on May 21, 2018.

Original bridge

The Port Authority had $3million of state money and raised $14million in bonds to build the Goethals Bridge and the Outerbridge Crossing. Construction of the Goethals bridge began on September 1, 1925, and it cost $7.2 million (equivalent to $million in ). The Goethals Bridge and the Outerbridge Crossing opened on June 29, 1928.

The original Goethals Bridge replaced three ferries and was the immediate neighbor of the Arthur Kill Rail Bridge. Its unusual mid-span height was a requirement of the New Jersey ports. The bridge was named for Major General George Washington Goethals, who supervised construction of the Panama Canal and was the first consulting engineer of the Port Authority.

Connecting onto the New Jersey Turnpike, it served as one of the main routes for traffic between New Jersey and Brooklyn via the Staten Island Expressway and the Verrazzano-Narrows Bridge. The original Goethals Bridge did not recoup its construction costs until the Verrazzano-Narrows Bridge was completed in 1964, facilitating regional through-traffic across Staten Island to Brooklyn. The same was true of the Outerbridge Crossing. The original Goethals Bridge had two  lanes in each direction, which did not meet the  requirement of modern highway design standards. The bridge also had no shoulders for emergency access, or pedestrian walkways or bike paths. By 2002, the bridge carried 15.68 million vehicles per year.

An initial study in 1997 concluded that the optimal solution would be a parallel span. However, a more recent study suggested that the original span had only 10 years of life left, even with the recent deck rehabilitation, and that the optimal solution was an entirely new span. The choosing of the full replacement option was followed by the submittal of several design alternatives, alongside a "no build" option. The new bridge design, upon the completion of the westbound span, also include additional lanes of traffic, high-speed E-ZPass lanes, and a reconstruction and widening of Interstate 278 from exit 4 in New York (NY 440 south) to Route 439 in New Jersey. The span was demolished starting in January 2018, after the opening of the replacement bridges.

New bridge

The initial alternatives put forth in mid-2006 included the option of twin three-lane replacement bridges north and south of the original alignment, which was eliminated; and twin three-lane replacement bridges (one south, and one along the original alignment), with the latter being built after the demolition of the original bridge, which was refined to be a single-span bridge instead of twin bridges. The twin-bridge alternative was dropped because of a height restriction set up by the FAA to prevent interferences with flights at Newark Liberty International Airport. The Goethals Bridge towers were not to exceed 272 feet in height and required to slant outwards because of aircraft flight patterns. This would also prevent ice from falling onto the roadway during winter months. Public open houses were held in Staten Island and Elizabeth, and the Draft Environmental Impact Statement (DEIS) was issued. Formal public hearings on the DEIS were held in July 2009.

The  main span of each bridge holds three  lanes with a  outer shoulder and  inner shoulder. The westbound span features a new  walkway for pedestrians and cyclists. In addition, permanent access roads would be built under the bridge on land for maintenance, security, and construction purposes. Lastly, space would be left in between the two bridges to accommodate potential mass-transit services. For mass transit, studies indicated that a bus-only lane was not economically viable but that a high-occupancy vehicle lane open to buses as well as high-occupancy autos would be appropriate during rush hours if traffic supported it. Provision for rail transit was rejected; however, planners decided that whatever alternative was constructed, the design and structural integrity should ideally be able to be retrofitted for such at a later date. The suggestion for a freight rail connection was dismissed as uneconomical.

Also as part of the construction, improvements to approaches and nearby interchanges were made. These include the New Jersey Turnpike exit 13 toll plaza, the Staten Island toll plaza, and the Interstate 278/NY 440 interchange. In addition, while separate from the bridge replacement project, the New Jersey Department of Transportation may construct full movements at the Interstate 278/U.S. Route 1/9 junction to coincide with the bridge's replacement.

On April 24, 2013, the Port Authority approved the $1.5-billion Goethals Bridge Project for preliminary funding, and broke ground in May 2014. The old bridge was closed on June 9, 2017, with eastbound traffic using the new eastbound bridge starting on June 10 and westbound traffic opening the next day. Initially, the new eastbound span carried 2 lanes of traffic in each direction, with each lane 11 feet wide until the new westbound span is complete. Once completed, the new westbound span would restore pedestrian and bicycle access. Westbound traffic was shifted from the new eastbound span to the newly opened westbound span on May 21, 2018. The bikeway and pedestrian walkway was set to open by mid-2018 but was then pushed back to an undetermined date. The bike path and pedestrian walkway finally opened on March 4, 2020.

The Goethals Bridge Replacement Project was given several prestigious awards upon its completion. In the highway/bridge category, the project won an ENR New York Best Projects and the Excellence in safety award, and it received the ENR New York's Project of the Year for 2018.

Tolls
, the tolls-by-mail rate going from New Jersey to New York are $17 for cars and motorcycles; there is no toll for passenger vehicles going from New York to New Jersey. New Jersey and New York–issued E-ZPass users are charged $12.75 for cars and $11.75 for motorcycles during off-peak hours, and $14.75 for cars and $13.75 for motorcycles during peak hours. Users with E-ZPass issued from agencies outside of New Jersey and New York are charged the tolls-by-mail rate.

Tolls are only collected for eastbound traffic. Originally, tolls were collected in both directions. In August 1970, the toll was abolished for westbound drivers, and at the same time, eastbound drivers saw their tolls doubled. The tolls of eleven other New York–New Jersey and Hudson River crossings along a  stretch, from the Outerbridge Crossing in the south to the Rip Van Winkle Bridge in the north, were also changed to south- or eastbound-only at that time.

Open-road cashless tolling began on September 4, 2019. The tollbooths were dismantled, and drivers are no longer able to pay cash at the bridge. Instead, there are cameras mounted onto new overhead gantries located on the Staten Island side. A vehicle without E-ZPass has a picture taken of its license plate and a bill for the toll is mailed to its owner. For E-ZPass users, sensors detect their transponders wirelessly.

See also
 
 
 
 
 
 List of bridges documented by the Historic American Engineering Record in New Jersey
 List of bridges documented by the Historic American Engineering Record in New York (state)

References

External links

Goethals Bridge
Goethals Bridge Replacement

1928 establishments in New York (state)
1928 establishments in New Jersey
2017 establishments in New York (state)
2017 establishments in New Jersey
Buildings and structures in Elizabeth, New Jersey
Bridges in Staten Island
Bridges in Union County, New Jersey
Bridges completed in 1928
Bridges completed in 2017
Bridges on the Interstate Highway System
Cantilever bridges in the United States
Cable-stayed bridges in the United States
Historic American Engineering Record in New Jersey
Historic American Engineering Record in New York City
Interstate 78
Interstate vehicle bridges in the United States
Port Authority of New York and New Jersey
Road bridges in New York City
Road bridges in New Jersey
Steel bridges in the United States
Toll bridges in New York City
Toll bridges in New Jersey
Tolled sections of Interstate Highways
Transportation in Elizabeth, New Jersey
Transportation projects in New York City
Truss bridges in the United States
1928 establishments in New York City